Little Creek Hundred is a hundred in Sussex County, Delaware, United States. Little Creek Hundred was formed in 1774 from Somerset County, Maryland. Its primary community is Laurel.

Little Creek Hundred is one of two Delaware hundreds of the name, the other being Little Creek Hundred in Kent County.

References

Hundreds in Sussex County, Delaware